Balizhuang Subdistrict may refer to:

 Balizhuang Subdistrict, Chaoyang District, Beijing
 Balizhuang Subdistrict, Haidian District, Beijing